Mark Samuel Cooper  (born February 14, 1960) is a former American football guard in the National Football League (NFL) for the Denver Broncos and the Tampa Bay Buccaneers. He started for the Broncos in Super Bowl XXI. Cooper attended the University of Miami.

External links
NFL.com player page

1960 births
Living people
Players of American football from Camden, New Jersey
American football offensive guards
Miami Hurricanes football players
Denver Broncos players
Tampa Bay Buccaneers players